"Bad Habits" is the lead single by English band The Last Shadow Puppets from their second studio album, Everything You've Come to Expect. It was released on 10 January 2016 on Domino Records, and is the first release of the band's second period of activity, making it their first single since "My Mistakes Were Made for You" (2008).

Writing and recording
In an interview with Stacey Anderson for Interview, Kane states that "Bad Habits" originated with Turner playing the bass guitar and Kane singing over top.  They admitted that the original take of the song came close to 40 minutes.

Critical reception
Brennan Carley of Spin magazine wrote that "Bad Habits" has got "a loud, insistent, urgent sound to it, with a prominent string section underscoring the chaos with a sense of unease."
Stereogum's Peter Helman noted that the song is "a brash, slitheringly groovy thing with an insistent bassline and some string section flourishes courtesy of maestro Owen Pallett."

Music video
A music video for "Bad Habits" was released on 10 January 2016, at the same day of the single's release. It shows the group performing in a California dive bar, with short snippets of Turner and Kane recording, socialising and womanising. The video was directed by Ben Chappell.

Track listing

Personnel
The Last Shadow Puppets
Alex Turner – acoustic guitar, backing vocals
Miles Kane – lead vocals, electric guitar
James Ford – drums, percussion, piano, vibraphone
Zach Dawes – bass guitar

Additional personnel
Owen Pallett – strings arrangement

Charts

References

2016 singles
2016 songs
The Last Shadow Puppets songs
Songs written by Alex Turner (musician)
Song recordings produced by James Ford (musician)
Songs written by Miles Kane
Domino Recording Company singles